Reqā' is one of the six scripts of Arabic calligraphy. Reqa' was used for private correspondence on small papers or for nonreligious books and texts. Ibn al-Nadim mentioned in his book Al-Fehrest, that the inventor of Reqa' script was Al-Fadl ibn Sahl. The script was one of the most popular scripts in the Ottoman Empire. Reqa' was gradually simplified by other calligraphers and was changed to a new script called Ruqʿah or Riqʿah, which is now the most common handwritten script in Arab countries.

References 

Typefaces
Arabic calligraphy